Abd al-Aziz bin Muhammad bin al-Siddiq al-Ghumari (November 1920 in Tangier – November 6, 1997, in Tangier) was a Muslim scholar from Morocco. He is from the Idrissite branch of Moroccan Sayyids that trace themselves back to Idris I, who led a Shiite revolt against the Abbasid dynasty. Among practitioners of Sufism, he was sometimes referred to as "the Muhammad al-Bukhari of the modern era."

Life

Family
Ben Sediq's father Sayyid Muhammad (b. 1887 d. November 6, 1935, in Tangier) was among prominent scholars such as his contemporary Sayyid al-Harrak. He used to teach the works of Ibn Abi Zayd and the book Sahih al-Bukhari. Among the scholars who wrote about him are his oldest son Ahmad Ben Sediq in a book called Subhat al Aqeek (سبحة العقيق) and the scholar Sheikh Muhammad al Ayachi in a book called Nubthat al Tahqeek (نبذة التحقيق). He also has a biography in the prominent Moroccan scholars encyclopaedia.

Death
After a long life of research excellence, Sayyid Abdelaziz Ben Sediq died in Tangier on Friday November 6, 1997. He was buried after a funeral in which the number of mourners set a record in Tangier's biggest ever gatherings.

Career
It was not a coincidence that Abdelaziz Ben Sediq's mother as well comes from family of known scholars. Her grandfather indeed was Imam Ahmad ibn Ajiba. He started his early education in Tangier and traveled to Cairo and was a student of Azhar scholars such as Mahmoud Imam and Abdul Muuti Sharshimi. Among his works, the book Mujam al Shuyukh (معجم الشيوخ) and Fath al Aziz Bi Asaanid Sayyid Abdelaziz (فتح العزيز باسانيد لسيد عبد العزيز). He wrote several articles in the Khadra (الخضراء) and al-Balagh newspaper in Tangier and al-Islam magazine in Cairo. Ghumari was one of the teachers of Saudi Arabian Sufi leader Muhammad Alawi al-Maliki, as well as fellow Moroccan preacher Hassan al-Kattani.

Like his older brothers Ahmad and Abdullah, Abd al-Aziz al-Ghumari was famous for his intellectual sparring with fellow hadith scholar Muhammad Nasiruddin al-Albani.

View
Although Ghumari studied in a Sunni Islamic university, he registered his own critical thinking and came up with views that were unpopular with his teachers in the Azhar University. He used to adopt views based on research even if they were outside the sect or the popular religious culture. Among such views are the following:

 Unlike Sunni religious culture where all the companions of prophet Muhammad are venerated, Ghumari used to mention 6 of the companions without venerating them because they fought against Ali  
 Unlike Muslim scholars who prohibit the celebration of Muhammad's birthday, Ghumari declared such celebration to be an obligation and a duty regardless if the tradition of celebrating birth days originate from the west or elsewhere.
 He agreed with Shia Islamic scholars on the supremacy of Ali over all people who came after Prophet Muhammad.
 In his book al-Ifada or "The interest in the ways on which the Hadith - that looking at Ali is a worship- is based" (الافادة بطرق حديث النظر الى علي عبادة), he openly criticized the narrations of hadith that were registered under the Umayyad and the Abbasid rule, and accused some narrators to be manipulated by the political ruling institution of that time. That was repeated over so many pages of the book.
 In his book Al-Ittihad (الاتحاد) he supported re-introducing tougher penalties for sorcery and related misdeeds.

Also like the rest of his family, Ghumari's exact theological viewpoints were difficult to pin down. Although a practitioner of Sufism, he was also critical of other Sufis. Though a Sunni, he and his brothers also held views in juristprudence and dogmatics outside of the mainstream. It is most likely that the Ghumaris had a unique viewpoint of their own.

Works

 Tasheel al Madraj ela al Mudarraj                 -تسهيل المدرج على المدرج
 Al Tanees fi Sharh Mandomat al-thahabi Fi-Tadlees -التانيس في شرح منضومة الذهبى في التذليس
 Bulugh al Amaani                                  -بلوغ الاماني
 al Baahit aan Elal al Taan Fil Haarith            - الباحث عن علل الطعن في الحارث
 al Tuhfat al Azeeziya                             -التحفة العزيزية
 al Taatuf                                         -التعطف في تخريج احاديث التعرف
 Al Jawaahir al Ghawali                            - الجواهر للغوالي
 Al Ifaada                                         - الافادة بطرق حديث النظر الى علي عبادة
 Al fath al Wahbi                                  -  الفتح الوهبي
 al Musheer                                        - المشير
 Al Tibyaan                                        - التبيان

and more.

Citations

External links
 Arabic Online Biography of the Ibn al-Siddiq family
 Link to Abd al-Aziz Ghumari videos and lectures (Arabic)
 

Sunni Sufis
Hadith scholars
20th-century imams
Jurisprudence academics
Moroccan imams
Moroccan scholars
Moroccan Sufi writers
20th-century Muslim scholars of Islam
People from Tangier
Banu Idris
Sunni fiqh scholars
Sunni Muslim scholars of Islam
Sunni imams
1920 births
1997 deaths
20th-century Moroccan people